David "Bombhead" Burke is a fictional character from the British Channel 4 soap opera Hollyoaks, played by Lee Otway. Initially known as "David Witherspoon", he appeared on the soap between 2001 and 2005. In 2010, Otway reprised the role in online spin-off Hollyoaks: Freshers. The character returned again on 13 January 2011 for two episodes.

Storylines
Bombhead was Lee Hunter's best friend, and was introduced into the series as a schoolfriend of Zara Morgan, Cameron Clark, Norman Sankofa, Abby Davies and Lee Hunter. Slightly odd, socially inept and occasionally stupid, but with a heart of gold, David frequently misunderstood other characters to comic effect. Bombhead liked to cook. He became somewhat of an apprentice to Tony Hutchinson, and worked in Il Gnosh. He was close friends with Gordon Cunningham, who was a father figure to him. He was devastated when Gordon and his wife, Helen, were killed in a car crash and briefly became a Christian.

When Bombhead's mother died, David suffered a mental breakdown. Unable to accept her death, he lived with her body and continued to act as if she were still alive, doing her dry cleaning and cooking her meals. David's only form of comfort during this time was a recurring hallucination of Gordon Cunningham, who would offer advice and try to convince Bombhead to accept what had happened and ask his friends for help. Cameron had noticed something was wrong with David and wanted to help him in return for Bombhead helping him when he attempted suicide. Cameron tried to get David to open up but he refused. David's mother's body was eventually discovered by his friend Lee. Lee had gone round to the house thinking it would be empty so he could have sex with his friend Stacey Foxx. Stacey sat down on Mrs Burke's body and screamed. Realising what had happened, Lee and his mother Sally convinced Bombhead to move in with the Hunters. After his mother's funeral, Bombhead stopped seeing visions of Mr Cunningham.

After his mother's death, Bombhead spent considerable time trying to track down his father, a person he only knew through letters his mother had hidden from him until her demise. After much effort, it became apparent that he would never succeed. It wasn't until Lee decided to hire a collection of clowns as a fundraising exercise for students at HCC that David would finally meet his father, a clown, of which ironically Bombhead had always suffered an irrational fear of. Bombhead's friendship with Lee would finally come to an end when Lee was turned against him by the evil machinations of Chris Fenwick, although once he found out what Chris was up to, Lee made up with Bombhead. David decided to leave Hollyoaks and join the circus to live with his father. Bombhead mattered so much to Lee that after Lee's hearing over diverting college funds, during which Chris used Bombhead's joining the circus against Lee, he punched Chris square in the face, saying, "This is for Bombhead".

In the spinoff Hollyoaks: Freshers, Lee called Bombhead to ask if he should propose to his girlfriend Leanne Holiday. Bombhead said since he loved her enough to try to retrieve the ring he had dropped down a portable toilet at a musical festival, then yes. Bombhead is seen on 13 January 2011 asking Amy Barnes where Lee & Leannes wedding is, he is there to be Lee's best man. After Amy reveals that Leanne wrote a fake letter in Amy's name, the wedding was ultimately called off. Leading Bombhead and Lee to hide in a wardrobe from Leanne. Bombhead talks to Amy about her relationship with Lee and how she didn't intend to break up Lee & Leanne, Bombhead helps Lee to get through the breakup and choose between Amy and Leanne by tossing a coin, Amy finds them doing this and is not impressed. He then returns home.

Reception
For his performance as Bombhead, Lee Otway was nominated in the ‘Best Actor’, ‘Best Dramatic Performance, ‘Best Storyline’ and ‘Best On-Screen partnership at the 2005 British Soap Awards.

Otway was nominated for a North West Comedy award in 2004 and 2005.

In 2010 'Bombhead’ appeared in the Hollyoaks spinoff, Hollyoaks: Freshers. This led to an internet campaign on Hollyoaks.com entitled 'bring back Bombhead' which led to his return to the show, making a guest appearance in 2011.

References

External links
 Character profile at Hollyoaks.com
 Character profile at the Internet Movie Database

Hollyoaks characters
Television characters introduced in 2001
Male characters in television
Fictional entertainers